KDPM (92.3 FM) is a terrestrial American radio station, which is currently broadcasting a full service hot country/ classic rock music format. Licensed to Marshall, Texas, United States, the station serves the Longview-Marshall East Texas area. The station is currently owned by 92.3 The Depot, LLC.

The Depot studio is located in downtown Marshall.  The station logo features the historic Marshall Texas Railroad Depot.  KDPM 92.3 The Depot is a proud member of the Marshall Chamber of Commerce.

History
The facility went on the air on June 6, 1988, as KEEP, and was originally the FM counterpart to 1410 KCUL. The facility's construction permit and subsequent license was originally applied for in 1985. KEEP was initially owned by East Texas Stereo Inc. (Tommy Moore of Shreveport).

KCUL Oldies Stereo Combo
In November 1992, the station changed its call sign to KCUL-FM to match the AM sister station.

KCUL AM & FM was a full service oldies station that served the city of Marshall, Texas for over 2 decades. KCUL AM/FM was completely live on-air talent 24/7. One of the featured programs was the morning swap shop.

In 2000, the long time owner of KCUL-AM/FM, East Texas Stereo Inc. sold the combo to Access.1 of New York. The sale coincided with the sale of Cary Kamp's Shreveport, Louisiana cluster to Access.1.

KCUL en Español
In 2005, KCUL-FM left its '50s to '70s oldies format after a 20 year run, flipping to a Regional Mexican format, becoming a simulcast partner of 96.7 KOYE in Frankston, Texas.

In 2013, the FCC forced Access.1 to sell two of its FM stations, so it was decided that KCUL-FM and 92.1 KSYR in Shreveport would be those stations, releasing both of them to Cosecha Communications LLC, as Trustee (a trust), and were intended to be sold at a later date. Due to the eventual sale of the bulk of the Access.1 stations in both East Texas and northwestern Louisiana, Access.1 ended up keeping KCUL-FM and KSYR, and entered into a shared services lease with Alpha Media, which ended in 2019. Alpha had an option to purchase the stations, but couldn't exercise the option due to ownership limits set by the FCC.

On September 2, 2015, Access.1 once again regained ownership of KCUL-FM and KSYR, after the sale of their larger stations to Alpha Media.

At its zenith (from 2005 to 2013) "La Invasora" was simulcast on 96.7 KOYE in Frankston, 92.1 KSYR in Benton, Louisiana, and 92.3 KCUL-FM Marshall. With the combined coverage area of these three signals, the Regional Mexican format spanned from Malakoff, Texas to Minden, Louisiana, and remained one of the few, if not only, Spanish language formats serving several of the small towns around East Texas and northwestern Louisiana.

On November 30, 2015, Access.1 ceased to exist. Access.1's remaining three stations KCUL-FM, KFRO, and KSYR, were folded into A.1 Investco LLC, controlled by Kevin Gunderson the CEO of Gugenheim Capital. 

In January 2019, Access.1 decided to divest their remaining three radio stations KCUL-FM Marshall, KSYR Shreveport, and WGYM Hammonton. KSYR was sold first, then KCUL-FM, and WGYM on October 28, 2019, ending Access.1 as a corporation on October 28, 2019.

On June 19, 2019, A.1 Investco filed to sell KCUL-FM to AM 1410 KZEY owner, RCA Broadcasting, LLC., reuniting the former Marshall based AM/FM combo. After 14 years together, KCUL-FM broke simulcast with 92.1 KSYR "La Invasora". The following day, KCUL-FM went silent.

After a nine-month negotiation and lengthy closing, RCA closed on the sale of KCUL-FM October 1, 2019. As a result, 92.3 and 1410 were reunited under the sane owner once again. 

On October 22, 2019, AM 1410 reacquired the KCUL call sign, and the KCUL-AM-FM Marshall radio combo was reunited. This would prove to be temporary, as on March 6, 2020, RCA filed to change KCUL-FM's call sign to KPRO, while still silent, after holding the KCUL-FM set for 28 years. The two stations then swapped call signs on May 27, 2020, putting KCUL (without the FM suffix) on 92.3 and KPRO on 1410.

Return to English programming
When KCUL 92.3 returned to broadcasting, it joined new sister station 1370 KFRO, becoming an affiliate of the Galaxy Nostalgia Network. KCUL aired the Galaxy Moonbeam Nitesite, a program of over 300 shows, which targets baby boomers. Galaxy is hosted by Gilbert Smith and Mike Bragg, and is an educational show that covers music, radio, television, movies, and historical events of the 20th century.

Effective October 2, 2020, RCA Broadcasting sold KCUL to 92.3 The Depot LLC., while the facility adopted a new call sign, KDPM.

The Depot Opens
KDPM, now known as "The Depot", began broadcasting live on October 19, 2020.  KDPM is "the radio station that sounds like East Texas."  The format is hot country and classic rock with an emphasis on music written or performed by Texans, or is in some way connected with the State of Texas.  The Depot sound was created by nationally recognized program director James "Chip" Arledge, AKA "The Fat Man." KDPM features lives and local radio shows; a morning show hosted by Arledge, a veteran radio personality, a midday show hosted by Seth Necessary and an evening show hosted by Mary Lynne O"Neal AKA "The Hometown Girl."  Necessary and O'Neal are music industry veterans.

References

External links

Original website 923thedepot.com

DPM (FM)
Radio stations established in 1990
1990 establishments in Texas